Fred Tom Mitchell (July 4, 1891 – December 5, 1953) was the President of the Mississippi State College (now Mississippi State University) from 1945 to 1953. He was an alumnus of Mississippi State University. He received a master's degree from Peabody College (now part of Vanderbilt University) and a PhD from Penn State University

Honors
The Mitchell Memorial Library at Mississippi State is named in his honor.

References

External links
Mississippi State University General Information
Gallery of the Presidents

Presidents of Mississippi State University
1891 births
1953 deaths
20th-century American academics